Hesperocolletes douglasi, the Rottnest bee or Douglas's broad-headed bee, is a rediscovered species of plasterer bee that is endemic to Australia, and the sole known member of the genus Hesperocolletes.

It was described from a single specimen collected in 1938 on Rottnest Island, located off the coast of Western Australia. A second specimen was found in 2015, in Banksia woodland at Pinjar, Western Australia.

Description
The bee's body is black, shiny and 12 mm long and wings were brown and up to 8 mm long.

It is about the same size as a honeybee. It is generally black and brown and moderately hairy.

Hesperocolletes douglasi is superficially like a number of other native bees and careful examination under a microscope would be required to distinguish a specimen.

Taxonomy
Bee expert Charles Michener described and named the species in 1965 on the basis of the 1938 specimen, designating it as the holotype, and created the monotypic genus Hesperocolletes for Hesperocolletes douglasi alone. No record of the circumstances of capture (e.g. flowers visited) is available.

The species, which is named for its collector, A.M. Douglas, belongs to the subfamily Paracolletinae, part of the large family Colletidae. Colletids are characterized by having a short, broad, blunt tongue ("glossa") (a flexible, hairy appendage at the end of the proboscis, not always visible as it can be retracted).

Paracolletines (at least in most species, including Hesperocolletes douglasi) have three submarginal cells in the fore wing and females usually have densely hairy hind legs (for carrying pollen). The diagnostic characters of H. douglasi can occur individually in various paracolletine bees, and it is the combination of those features that one must look for:

lower part of face yellow-brown.
labrum (a hinged flap attached to the lower margin of the face) more than twice as wide as long and not strongly convex.
a distinct carina (sharp edge) around and especially behind each compound eye.
tarsal claws with inner prongs expanded and flattened.

Habitat and range 

A further, female, specimen was found in 2015, in "an isolated banksia woodland remnant in the Southwest Floristic Region of Western Australia (...) in the Gnangara-Moore River State Forest, north of Perth".

After its rediscovery in 2015, Hesperocolletes douglasi's conservation status has been changed from "presumed extinct" to "critically endangered" under the Western Australian Wildlife Conservation Act. Little is known about the biology, ecology and geographic range of this rare and enigmatic native bee species, and its rediscovery highlights the importance of preservation, restoration and proper management of remnant vegetation in face of anthropogenic threats to safeguard habitat for biodiversity.

See also 
 Australian native bees

References

External links
Report of the rediscovery of the species: https://www.communitynews.com.au/wanneroo-times/news/native-bee-thought-extinct-found-in-pinjar-banksia-woodland/
 
 

Colletidae
Hymenoptera of Australia
Fauna of Western Australia
Endemic fauna of Australia
Rottnest Island
Monotypic bee genera